Kana Oyama (大山 加奈 Ōyama Kana, born June 19, 1984) is a Japanese volleyball player who plays for Toray Arrows. She competed at the 2004 Summer Olympics in Athens, Greece wearing the #13 jersey. There, she and the Japan women's national team took fifth place. Oyama played as a wing-spiker. The Toray Arrows announced her retirement on 29 June 2010.

Profiles
While attending Seitoku Gakuen high school, the volleyball team won the high school national championship, with Erica Araki
She was selected for the national team for the Olympic games in Beijing, but declined due to lumbago.
Miki Oyama is her younger sister.
She retired due to back pain on 29 June 2010.

Clubs
 Seitoku Gakuen High School
 Toray Arrows (2003–2010)

Awards

Individual 
2003 - 10th V.League New Face award

Team 
2004 Kurowashiki All Japan Volleyball Championship -  Champion, with Toray Arrows
2007 Domestic Sports Festival (Volleyball) -  Champion, with Toray Arrows
2007-2008 Empress's Cup -   Champion, with Toray Arrows
2007-2008 V.Premier League -  Champion, with Toray Arrows
2008 Domestic Sports Festival -  Runner-Up, with Toray Arrows
2008-2009 V.Premier League -  Champion, with Toray Arrows
2009 Kurowashiki All Japan Volleyball Championship -  Champion, with Toray Arrows
2009-2010 V.Premier League -  Champion, with Toray Arrows

National team

Senior team 
2004 - Summer Olympic games in Athens, 5th place

References

External links
 FIVB biography
Toray Arrows Women's Volleyball Team

1984 births
Living people
People from Tokyo
Japanese women's volleyball players
Volleyball players at the 2004 Summer Olympics
Olympic volleyball players of Japan
Place of birth missing (living people)
Asian Games medalists in volleyball
Volleyball players at the 2002 Asian Games
Asian Games bronze medalists for Japan
Medalists at the 2002 Asian Games